Aliabad-e Kukhdan (also Romanized as ‘Alīābād-e Kūkhdān; also known as ‘Alīābād) is a village in Dana Rural District, in the Central District of Dana County, Kohgiluyeh and Boyer-Ahmad Province, Iran. At the 2006 census, its population was 142, in 29 families.

References 

Populated places in Dana County